Todd S. Nelson is an American businessman who has been the CEO of three of America's largest for-profit college chains: Apollo Group, Education Management Corporation, and Career Education Corporation. He is currently the CEO of Perdoceo Education Corporation, the parent company of Colorado Technical University, American Intercontinental University, and Trident University International.

Early life
Todd S. Nelson earned a Bachelor of Science degree in 1982 from Brigham Young University and an MBA from the University of Nevada, Reno in 1983. He was a faculty member at the University of Nevada Las Vegas from 1983 to 1984.

Apollo Group (1987–2006)
Nelson started with Apollo Group in 1987 as the director of the University of Phoenix's Utah campus, and was named executive vice president of University of Phoenix in 1989, vice president of Apollo Group in 1994, president of Apollo Group in 1998, CEO of Apollo in 2001, and chairman of the board in 2004. During Nelson's tenure, the company changed its business practices from relying on corporate investments in employee education and enrolling mid-level employees at major companies to relying on government funds and open enrollment. Nelson resigned in 2006 after University of Phoenix faced allegations of illegal business practices. At the time of Nelson's resignation, Apollo Group's annual revenues were $2.2 billion with an enrollment of more than 300,000 students. Nelson's compensation package was $22.1 million in 2005, with a 5-year compensation of $61 million. His compensation package in 2006 was $41.3 million.

Education Management Corporation (2007–2015)
Nelson was CEO of Education Management (EDMC) from 2007 to 2015, bringing several Apollo Group executives to the company. EDMC's schools included the Art Institutes, Argosy University, Brown Mackie College, and South University. During his time at EDMC, the company grew into the second largest US for-profit college chain and faced allegations of illegal enrolment tactics. Nelson's highest annual compensation was $13.1 million.  In 2017, EDMC filed for bankruptcy.

Career Education Corporation-Perdoceo (2015–present)
Nelson has been the CEO of Perdoceo Education Corporation (formerly known as Career Education Corporation) since 2015. Nelson guided the company through several school closings, including the shuttering of Le Cordon Bleu, Briarcliffe College and Sanford-Brown campuses. Perdoceo is the parent company of Colorado Technical University, American Intercontinental University, and Trident University International. In 2019, Nelson made $7.4 million in total compensation. He currently holds about $12 million in equities from the company.

See also
Apollo Group
Career Education Corporation
Education Management Corporation
For-profit colleges in the United States
For-profit higher education in the United States
Perdoceo Education Corporation

References

External links
 Perdoceo Education Corporation

Higher education in the United States
Brigham Young University alumni
University of Nevada, Las Vegas alumni
American business executives
Living people
Year of birth missing (living people)